Pták (feminine: Ptáková) is a Czech surname meaning "bird". Notable people with the surname include:
 Jiří Pták (born 1946), Czech Olympic rower
 Vlastimil Pták (1925–1999), Czech mathematician

See also
 

Czech-language surnames